List of bridges documented by the Historic American Engineering Record in Washington may refer to:

 List of bridges documented by the Historic American Engineering Record in Washington (state)
 List of bridges documented by the Historic American Engineering Record in Washington, D.C.